Jovanovski is a common Macedonian surname. It derives from Jovan, which is comparable to John in English. The part ov designates possession: Jovanov means John's/Jovan's. The suffix -ski means "from the family of" or "son of", thus 'Jovanovski' is equivalent to 'Johnson' in English, and may refer to:

 Bojana Jovanovski (born 1991), Serbian tennis player
 Ed Jovanovski (born 1976), Canadian hockey player of Macedonian descent
 Gjore Jovanovski (born 1956), Macedonian footballer and manager
 Marko Jovanovski, Macedonian footballer
 Meto Jovanovski (born 1946), Macedonian actor
 Meto Jovanovski (born 1928), Macedonian writer
 Vlado Jovanovski (born 1967), Macedonian actor
 Zoran Jovanovski (born 1972), Macedonian footballer

See also
 Jovanović, Serbian equivalent

Surnames
Macedonian-language surnames